Pasieka may refer to:

 Pasieka, code name of the headquarters of the Szare Szeregi
 Pasieka Island, an island on the Odra River in Opole, Poland
Pasieka, Łódź Voivodeship (central Poland)
Pasieka, Kuyavian-Pomeranian Voivodeship (north-central Poland)
Pasieka, Janów Lubelski County in Lublin Voivodeship (east Poland)
Pasieka, Kraśnik County in Lublin Voivodeship (east Poland)
Pasieka, Parczew County in Lublin Voivodeship (east Poland)
Pasieka, Podlaskie Voivodeship (north-east Poland)
Pasieka, Greater Poland Voivodeship (west-central Poland)
Pasieka, Silesian Voivodeship (south Poland)
Pasieka, Pomeranian Voivodeship (north Poland)
Pasieka, West Pomeranian Voivodeship (north-west Poland)

See also